Raúl Francisco Martínez-Malo Jr. (born August 7, 1965), known professionally as Raúl Malo, is an American singer, songwriter, guitarist and record producer. He is the lead singer of country music band The Mavericks and the co-writer of many of their singles, as well as Rick Trevino's 2003 single "In My Dreams". After the disbanding of The Mavericks in the early 2000s, Malo pursued a solo career. He has also participated from 2001 in the Los Super Seven supergroup.  The Mavericks re-formed in 2012 and continue to tour extensively. In 2015 they won the Americana music award for duo/group of the year.

Solo discography

Albums

Singles

Music videos

References

External links

1965 births
Living people
American male singer-songwriters
American country singer-songwriters
American musicians of Cuban descent
People from Miami
Country musicians from Florida
Singer-songwriters from Florida
The Mavericks members